Abdul Ghani Kasuba is an Indonesian politician and the current governor and former lieutenant governor of North Maluku.

Kasuba denoted South Halmahera Regency as a region he wanted to develop as the province's tourism hub. In 2017, he inaugurated the Widi International Fishing Tournament as one of those ways.

After visiting representatives of the Jinchun Group in Guangzhou, Kasuba successfully negotiated for the group to build a nickel smelter on Obira in the Obi Islands.

References

Governors of North Maluku
Indonesian Muslims
Living people
People from North Maluku
1951 births
Prosperous Justice Party politicians
Islamic University of Madinah alumni